Nordheim was a municipality in the district Schmalkalden-Meiningen, in Thuringia, Germany. On December 1, 2007, it became part of Grabfeld.

Former municipalities in Thuringia
Duchy of Saxe-Meiningen